Delhi is a vast city and a union territory, and is home to a population of more than 16 million people. It is a microcosm of India and its residents belong to varied ethnic, religious and linguistic groups. As the second-largest city, and the capital of the nation, its 11 revenue or administrative districts comprise multiple neighbourhoods. The large expanse of the city comprises residential districts that range from poor to affluent, and small and large commercial districts, across its municipal extent.

This is a list of major neighbourhoods in the city and only pertains to the National Capital Territory of Delhi. It is not complete, and outlines the various neighbourhoods based on the different districts of the metropolis.

North West Delhi 
Adarsh Nagar
 Ashok Vihar
 Begum Pur
 Karala
 Narela
 Pitam Pura
 Rohini Sub City
 Shalimar Bagh

North Delhi 
 Azadpur
 Civil Lines
 Derawal Nagar
 Gulabi Bagh
 Kamla Nagar
 Kashmiri Gate
 Daryaganj
 Model Town
 Sadar Bazaar    
 Sarai Rohilla
 Shakti Nagar                                 
 Tis Hazari
 Timarpur
 Wazirabad
 GTB Nagar
 Mukherjee Nagar

North East Delhi 
 Dilshad Garden
 Naveen Shahdara
 New Usmanpur
 Shahdara
 Shastri Park
 Yamuna Vihar
 Gokal Puri
 Ganga Vihar
 Bhajan Pura, Near Gokal Puri

Central Delhi 
 Chandni Chowk
 Daryaganj
 Jhandewalan
 Karol Bagh
Shastri Nagar
 Kishanganj
 Paharganj
 Rajender Nagar

New Delhi 
 Barakhamba Road
 Chanakyapuri
 Connaught Place
 Gole Market
 INA Colony
 Laxmibai Nagar
 Pragati Maidan

East Delhi 
 East Vinod Nagar
 Jhilmil Colony
 Laxmi Nagar
 Mayur Vihar
 Pandav Nagar
 Preet Vihar
 Anand Vihar
 Shreshtha Vihar
 Vivek Vihar
 Vasundhara Enclave
 Vishwas Nagar
 Vivek Vihar
 Kamal Hans Nagar
 Ram Vihar
 Surajmal Vihar
 Bank Enclave
 Park End
 Yojna Vihar

South Delhi 
 Chattarpur
 Green Park
 Gulmohar Park
 Hauz Khas
 Hauz Khas Village
 Khanpur
 Malviya Nagar
 Mehrauli
 Neeti Bagh
 Netaji Nagar
 Safdarjung Enclave
 Sainik Farm
 Saket
 Sangam Vihar
 Sarojini Nagar
 Sarvodaya Enclave
 Siri Fort
 South Extension
 Sriniwaspuri

South East Delhi 
 Jor Bagh
 Lodhi Colony
 Khan Market
 Sundar Nagar
 Nizamuddin East
 Nizamuddin West
 Sarai Kale Khan
 Jangpura
 Defence Colony
 Lajpat Nagar
 New Friends Colony
 Nehru Place
 Kalkaji
 East of Kailash
 Chittaranjan Park
 Govindpuri
 Greater Kailash
 Alaknanda 
 Jamia Nagar
 Okhla
 Sarita Vihar
 Jaitpur
 Tughlaqabad
 Badarpur
 Pul Pehladpur

South West Delhi 
 Dabri, New Delhi
 Dwarka Sub City
 Delhi Cantonment
 Dhaula Kuan
 Inderpuri
 Mahipalpur
 Moti Bagh
 Munirka
 Najafgarh
 Naraina
 Palam
 Rama Krishna Puram
 Sagar Pur
 Vasant Kunj
 Vasant Vihar

West Delhi 
 Ashok Nagar
 Bali Nagar
 Fateh Nagar
 Kirti Nagar
 Moti Nagar
 Paschim Vihar
 Patel Nagar
 Punjabi Bagh
 Rajouri Garden
 Tihar Village
 Tilak Nagar
 Vikas Nagar
 Vikaspuri
 Uttam Nagar

See also 
 Indira Gandhi International Airport
 New Delhi Railway Station
 Hazrat Nizamuddin Railway Station
 Old Delhi Railway Station
 Kashmere Gate
 Gurugram
 Ghaziabad
 Noida
 Faridabad
 Sonipat

References

External links 

Govt. of New Delhi 
"Urban agglomerations/cities having population 1 million and above" (PDF). Provisional population totals, census of India 2011. Registrar General & Census Commissioner, India. 2011. Retrieved 26 January 2012.

 
Delhi
Delhi-related lists